Nigel Dick (born 21 March 1953) is a British music video and film director, writer and musician from Catterick, England, now based in Los Angeles, California.  He directed the Britney Spears videos "...Baby One More Time" and "Oops!... I Did It Again", the Band Aid video "Do They Know It's Christmas?", as well as over 500 other music videos.

Education
Educated at Gresham's School in Holt and the University of Bath, Dick began completing a degree in architecture before pursuing a career in the record business. He has studied mime and is also a graduate of Judith Weston's Acting for Directors class.

Career
Before success in the music and film industries, Dick worked as an architectural draughtsman, a clerk, a busker, a cab driver, a construction worker, a farm labourer, a motorcycle messenger, a salesman, a waiter, and served a spell in the Sewage Division of the Anglian Water Authority.

He began his career in the record business working at Stiff Records, where he stayed for five years working as a Press Officer with Madness, Ian Dury, Lene Lovich, and the Plasmatics. In the early 1980s he moved to Phonogram Records, and while there directed the original Band Aid video "Do They Know It's Christmas?". In 1986, Dick moved to Los Angeles to direct his first feature film, P.I. Private Investigations (1987), starring Ray Sharkey and Martin Balsam. Since then, he has directed more than twenty documentaries and feature films and over three hundred music videos.

In 1986, he co-founded Propaganda Films, which became a major production company for commercials and music videos.

In 1999, he directed MTV's first made-for-TV feature 2gether. The film spawned a TV series and two albums. Dick co-wrote a number of songs on the first album which reached the US Top-40 chart. In 2003, he directed Seeing Double for Simon Fuller's 19 Entertainment, which starred British pop act S Club 7.

In 2008, E! Television announced that Dick would be co-exec producing an observational documentary TV series starring Pamela Anderson titled: Pam: Girl On The Loose.

The artists and bands Dick has directed to date include The Offspring, Britney Spears, Jessica Simpson, Cher, Breaking Benjamin, Anastacia, Carly Simon, Def Leppard, Steve Lukather, Nickelback, Guns N' Roses, Oasis, Kula Shaker, Backstreet Boys, Toni Braxton, Good Charlotte, Green Day, Il Divo, Elton John, Ricky Martin, Paul McCartney, Amy Lee, Tina Turner, Celine Dion, REM, Gloria Estefan, S Club, Pussycat Dolls, and Ozzy Osbourne.

Awards
Dick's film work has won three MTV awards, two Billboard Awards and three MVPA awards.  His videos have won a BRIT Award and been nominated for more than twenty MTV Video Music Awards, sixteen MuchMusic Video Awards and a Grammy Award.  His personal nominations include a Cable Ace Award.

Musician
Dick was a founding member of pub-rock act and Stiff Records house band The Stiff All Stars. The band was briefly signed to Stiff Records competitor Chiswick Records in 1980 and subsequently released four singles. Band line-up was Andy Murray (guitar, vocals), Nigel Dick (bass, vocals), Pete Glenister (guitar), Nicky Graham (keys), Nick Garnett (drums) Hugh Attwooll (drums). Despite the band's name, only Murray and Dick actually worked at Stiff Records; Glenister went on to write and produce for Alison Moyet, Kirsty MacColl, Darius; Graham went on to write and produce Bros. The band appeared on TV, toured frequently and supported Jools Holland, Any Trouble, Madness amongst others. Jamie West-Oram featured in an early line-up but left to join The Fixx. Thirty years after the release of their first single The Stiff All Stars released their first album '12.5 on a 10 Point Scale' which featured new tracks and previously unreleased songs featuring Jeff Porcaro (Toto) and Carl Verheyen (Supertramp).

Dick also appeared four times as a backing musician on BBC's famous 'Top of the Pops': three times with Jona Lewie ('Kitchen at Parties', 'Stop The Cavalry') and once with The Snowmen ('Hokey Cokey').

As a guitarist, he has released three albums:
 Flesh, Blood, Wood, Steel
 All Stars And All Sorts
 Weird Stain

Traveller
Dick travels by bicycle and has made cycle tours in fourteen countries, including the United States, Canada, Mexico, New Zealand, Australia, Thailand, Vietnam, and various European countries, including the United Kingdom.

Selected music video credits (as director)

Credits as director (Feature films)
 Berlin Calling  (2014) Berlin Calling
 Pam: Girl on the Loose (2008)
 In Search of the Lanterne Rouge (currently in production) rougefilm
 Callback (2005) callbackthemovie
 Seeing Double (2003)
 2gether  (2000)
 The Elevator (1996) (co-director, one segment)
 Dead Connection (1993)
 Deadly Intent (1988)
 P.I. Private Investigations (1987)

Credits as screenwriter (Feature films)
 Berlin Calling (2014) (co-writer) Berlin Calling
 Stella Roxx and The Killer Bats From Hell (2006)
 Sidewalking (2004)
 Callback  (1999)
 Everlasting (1995)
 Country Lyfe (1994)
 Hangman (1994)
 Introducing Eric (1993) (story by Nigel Dick)
 One Week in April (1990)
 Deadly Intent (1988) (uncredited)
 P.I. Private Investigations (1987) (story by Nigel Dick)

References

External links
 Nigeldick.com – Official site

 Nigel Dick at Clipland
 Nigel Dick at mvdbase.com

English film directors
British film directors
British music video directors
People educated at Gresham's School
Alumni of the University of Bath
People from Catterick, North Yorkshire
1953 births
Living people
British expatriates in the United States